Walnut Grove is an unincorporated community in Hamilton County, Indiana, in the United States.

The community was likely named for a grove of walnut trees nearby.

References

Unincorporated communities in Hamilton County, Indiana
Unincorporated communities in Indiana